Combat Wombat is a 2020 Australian 3D computer-animated superhero film directed by Richard Cussó and written by Matthew James Kinmonth. A stand-alone sequel to The Wishmas Tree (2019), it is the second film in Like a Photon Creative's The Tales from Sanctuary City franchise, and was financed by Screen Queensland and Screen Australia. It premiered at the Brisbane International Film Festival before being released in Australian theatres on 15 October 2020, distributed by Odin Eye's Entertainment.

Premise 
Lazy wombat Maggie Diggins becomes Combat Wombat, Sanctuary City's new superhero after she begrudgingly saves a citizen from falling to his death. However, her rising stardom displeases local superhero Flightless Feather, who hatches a plan for Maggie's demise. But in the process, Maggie uncovers a conspiracy that could put the city in grave danger, and it is up to her to expose it.

Voice cast 
Deborah Mailman as Maggie Diggins / Combat Wombat
Ed Oxenbould as Sweetie
Frank Woodley as Flightless Feather 
Judith Lucy as PR manager CeCe
George Pullar as Bradley Burrows / Raccoon Bandit

Release and reception 
Combat Wombat was released in Australian theatres on 15 October 2020, distributed by Odin Eye's Entertainment. It had a limited release to 42 screens. At the box office it grossed $164,199. It received positive reviews from critics.

References

External links 

2020 computer-animated films
2020 films
2020s Australian animated films
2020s superhero films
Animated superhero films
Australian computer-animated films
The Tales from Sanctuary City
2020s English-language films
Screen Australia films
2020s Australian films